Russell L. Smith is a United States Navy sailor who served as the 15th Master Chief Petty Officer of the Navy (MCPON). He was acting MCPON from June 22, 2018, when Steven S. Giordano resigned, to August 29, 2018, when he officially assumed the role.

Naval career
Smith is a graduate of the United States Navy Senior Enlisted Academy (Class 125/Blue) and the Command Master Chief/Chief of the Boat (CMC/COB) Course (Class 42) at the Naval War College.

Smith reported to Recruit Training Center San Diego, California, in September 1988, and began his career as a airman. He became a weapons technician in 1990, then converted to the intelligence specialist rating in 1993. He was selected for the command master chief program in 2007.

Smith had six shipboard deployments to the western Pacific and Central Command area of responsibility in support of operations Desert Storm and Desert Fox, a 292-day deployment during operations Enduring Freedom and Iraqi Freedom, disaster relief operations in Indonesia and counter-piracy operations in the Horn of Africa. He also served on numerous deployments and detachments while attached to Naval Special Warfare and Defense Intelligence Agency elements.

Smith's shore tours include service as the operations non-commissioned officer at the United States Defense Attaché Office in Moscow, Russia; on the Chief of Naval Operations' staff as the senior enlisted for the intelligence community; as the CMC for the Office of Naval Intelligence; as the OPNAV Staff's command master chief in Washington, DC; as the United States Naval Academy's command master chief in Annapolis, and most recently as the fleet master chief, Manpower, Personnel, Training, and Education in January 2017. 

In February 2022, it was made public that Smith was under investigation by the Naval Inspector General for unspecified misconduct.

On 22 April 2022, he visited the carrier  after several crew members had committed suicide over the previous ten months, including three in one week earlier in the month. The ship has been at Newport News for a major mid-life overhaul since 2017, and many of the crew have reported life aboard the ship difficult due to the construction-like atmosphere, and the lengthy commute some of them must take daily. After meeting with the crew, several of them reported feeling unsatisfied with the responses from Smith to their concerns. 

He vacated the MCPON office on September 8, 2022 to Fleet Master Chief James Honea.

Awards and decorations

Eight gold service stripes.
Smith received the Edwin T. Layton Leadership Award in fall of 2002 for leadership in the Intelligence Community.

References

Year of birth missing (living people)
Living people
Master Chief Petty Officers of the United States Navy
Recipients of the Legion of Merit